Sir William Twysden, 3rd Baronet (11 December 1635 – 27 November 1697), of Roydon Hall in Kent, was an English landowner and member of parliament.

He was the eldest son of Sir Roger Twysden, 2nd Baronet and Isabella Saunders, daughter of Sir Nicholas Saunders, and succeeded to the baronetcy on 27 June 1672.

He entered Parliament in 1685 as member for Kent, and subsequently also represented Appleby, and was elected for New Romney although he never sat for the constituency.

He married Frances Cross, daughter of Josiah Cross, and they had ten children including Sir Thomas Twysden, 4th Baronet (c. 1676–1712) and Sir William Twysden, 5th Baronet (1677–1751).

References
 
 Twysden genealogy

|-

1635 births
1697 deaths
Twysden, William, 3rd Baronet
English landowners
English MPs 1685–1687
English MPs 1695–1698
People from East Peckham